Jilu or Ji–Lu Mandarin, formerly known as Beifang Mandarin "Northern Mandarin", is a dialect of Mandarin Chinese spoken in the Chinese provinces of Hebei (Jì) and the western part of Shandong (Lǔ) and Xunke, Tangwang & Jiayin counties of Heilongjiang. Its name is a combination of the abbreviated names of the two provinces, which derive from ancient local provinces. The names are combined as Ji–Lu Mandarin.

Although these areas are near Beijing, Ji–Lu has a different accent and many lexical differences from the Beijing dialect, which is the basis for Standard Chinese, the official national language. There are three dialect groups: Bao–Tang, Shi–Ji, and Cang–Hui.

People from the eastern part of Shandong, or the Jiaodong Peninsula, speak Jiaoliao Mandarin.

Dialect groups
, incorporating a large part of Tianjin and northern part of Hebei province.
Tianjin dialect


 石济片, incorporating a large part of central Hebei province including the capital Shijiazhuang and western part of Shandong province, including the capital Jinan
Xingtai dialect

Jinan dialect
, incorporating the coastal region of the Yellow River Delta (including the prefecture-level city of Cangzhou, from which it takes its name)

The Bao–Tang dialect shares the same tonal evolution of the checked tone from Middle Chinese as Beijing Mandarin and Northeastern Mandarin. Moreover, the popularization of Standard Chinese in the two provincial capitals has induced changes in the Shi–Ji dialect causing the former to shift rapidly towards the standard language.

References

Further reading
 

Mandarin Chinese
Varieties of Chinese